
Łowicz County is a unit of territorial administration and local government (powiat) in Łódź Voivodeship, central Poland. It came into being on January 1, 1999, as a result of the Polish local government reforms passed in 1998.

As of 2006 its total population is 82,338, out of which the population of Łowicz is 30,204 and the rural population is 52,134.

Neighbouring counties
Łowicz County is bordered by Sochaczew County to the north-east, Skierniewice County to the south-east, Brzeziny County to the south, Zgierz County to the south-west, Łęczyca County and Kutno County to the west, and Gostynin County to the north-west.

Administrative division
The county is subdivided into 10 gminas (one urban and nine rural). These are listed in the following table, in descending order of population.

References
Polish official population figures 2006

 
Land counties of Łódź Voivodeship